FC Dynamo Kostroma is an association football club from Kostroma, Russia, founded in 1926. It played in 2010 and 2011–12 seasons, in the Russian Second Division.

External links
Profile on 2liga.ru

Association football clubs established in 1926
Football clubs in Russia
Sport in Kostroma
1926 establishments in Russia